Edward Young-min Kwon (born February 10, 1972) is a South Korean celebrity chef who has made a mission for himself to globalize Korean cuisine. Kwon has held many senior chef positions in luxury hotels in the United States, China, and the Middle East.

Background
Kwon was raised in Gangneung, a seaside town on the eastern coast of South Korea. Prior to his career as a culinary chef, he  received an education at Gangneung Yeongdong College. Kwon had started his career at the Ritz-Carlton in Seoul and in 2001, transferred to San Francisco to work at the Ritz-Carlton Half Moon Bay. At age 32, Kwon decided to move back to South Korea to assume the position of executive sous chef at the W Hotel in Seoul. Soon after, Kwon went to China, and later became the hotel head chef at the Burj al-Arab Hotel in Dubai. In 2009, Kwon returned to Seoul . As of 2011, he hosted his own television show, Yes Chef.

Restaurants
Kwon owns three restaurants in Seoul. Eddie's Café, located in the Seocho District, is a restaurant that offers European/Western style food at a mid-range price. Located in Hannam-dong is a restaurant called "The Mixed One". The Mixed One is a California Multi cuisine bistro offering reasonable prices.  The third restaurant,  Lab XXIV, located in Cheongdam-dong, features contemporary European styled cuisine.

References 

1972 births
Living people
South Korean chefs